The 2022 William & Mary Tribe football team represented the College of William & Mary as a member of the Colonial Athletic Association (CAA) during the 2022 NCAA Division I FCS football season. The Tribe, led by fourth-year head coach Mike London, played their home games at Zable Stadium. By finishing 7–1 in regular season CAA games, the Tribe tied with New Hampshire as conference co-champions. They went 6–0 on the road in the regular season for the first time in program history. William & Mary earned the FCS playoffs automatic bid. They made it to the quarterfinals before losing 55–7 to the #3 team in the nation, Montana State. The 11 wins tied a school record previously set twice, in 2004 and 2009.

Previous season

The Tribe finished the 2021 season with an overall record of 6–5, 4–4 CAA play to finish in a five-way tie for third place.

Preseason

CAA poll
In the CAA preseason poll released on July 28, 2022, the Tribe were predicted to finish in fifth place out of 13 teams following the departure of James Madison and the addition on Monmouth and Hampton for the 2022 season.

Preseason All-CAA team
Senior running back Bronson Yoder and senior defensive lineman Nate Lynn  were named to the CAA preseason all-conference team. Lynn was also named the preseason CAA Defensive Player of the Year.

Schedule

Game summaries

at Charlotte

This was William & Mary's first win over an FBS team since 2009, when the Tribe upset Virginia 26–14 in Charlottesville.

Campbell

at Lafayette

Elon

at Stony Brook

No. 6 Delaware

at Towson

No. 18 Rhode Island

at Hampton

Villanova

at No. 11 Richmond

FCS Playoffs

Gardner–Webb – Second Round

at No. 4 Montana State – Quarterfinals

Awards and honors
William & Mary had a league-high 13 players receive all-conference honors, highlighted by two major award winners in John Pius and Jalen Jones. Pius was also named a top-three finalist for the Buck Buchanan Award, given annually to the most outstanding defensive player in all of Division I FCS.
 CAA Defensive Player of the Year – John Pius (linebacker, sophomore)
 CAA Defensive Rookie of the Year – Jalen Jones (cornerback, freshman)
 CAA First Team Offense – Bronson Yoder (running back, senior); Charles Grant (offensive lineman, sophomore); Colby Sorsdal (offensive lineman, senior)
 CAA First Team Defense – Nate Lynn (defensive lineman, senior); John Pius (linebacker, sophomore); Ryan Poole (cornerback, senior); Caylin Newton (special teams, senior)
 CAA Second Team Offense – Donavyn Lester (fullback / halfback, senior); Lachlan Pitts (tight end, senior); Ethan Chang (placekicker, sophomore)
 CAA Second Team Defense – Carl Fowler (defensive lineman, senior); Isaiah Jones (linebacker, senior); Jalen Jones (cornerback, freshman)

References

William and Mary
William & Mary Tribe football seasons
Colonial Athletic Association football champion seasons
William and Mary
William and Mary Tribe football